This is a list of people who have served as mayor of Saint Paul, Minnesota.

Parties

References

Saint Paul, Minnesota